Harbour Lights is a British television drama series, broadcast on BBC One, that ran for two series in 1999 and 2000. Starring Nick Berry as protagonist Mike Nicholls, a former Royal Navy officer who returns to his childhood town of Bridehaven to take on the role of harbourmaster. The first series featured on storylines including a blossoming romance with local constable Melanie Rush (Tina Hobley), the ruthless business dealings of Tony Simpson (Gerard Horan), and the inter-family feuding of the Blades — Steve, George, Jason, Kelly and Rita. Both series were predominantly filmed in West Bay near Bridport in Dorset, which acts as the fictional town of Bridehaven. The second series featured much harder-hitting storylines than the first, and was criticised by local residents for portraying West Bay in a bad light.

The complete series was released on Region 4 DVD on 3 March 2011. This is the only commercial release of the series available. The second episode of the first series, "Marie  Celeste", was famously said to be 'missing' and was never broadcast on the BBC. It has, however, been shown during repeat screenings of the series on digital television, and is included in the DVD release.

Filming locations
Locations used for filming in the series include;

 Bridehaven Harbour Master's Office - West Bay (Bridport) Harbour Master's Office (series 1 and 2).
 Bridehaven Carnival - Bridport Carnival (series 1, episode 1).
 Bridehaven Trawler and Speedboat Race - West Bay Trawler Parade (series 1, episode 1).
 Bridehaven Torchlight Procession - Bridport to West Bay Torchlight Procession (series 1, episode 2).
 Sea View Restaurant - Riverside Restaurant (series 1).
 The Pier's Hotel - Bridport Arms Hotel (series 1).
 Bridehaven Arms - Bridport Arms Public House (series 1 and 2).
 Pink Cottage on East Beach - Harbour Master's Residence (series 1, up to episode 4).
 Cottage attached to Bridport Arms (on left) - Harbour Master's Residence (series 1, episode 5 onwards).
 Parents residence of dead colleague of Harbour Master - The Cottage, Third Cliff Walk (series 1, up to episode 4).
 Blade family residence - Cottage in George Street (next to George Hotel) (series 1 and 2).
 Quayside Amusements - Harbour Amusements (series 1 and 2).
 Harbour Café - Harbour Café (series 1).
 George's Café - Harbour Café (series 2).
 St John's Church (series 1 and 2).
 Highlands End Holiday Park - (series 1, episode 4).
 Bridehaven Village Hall - Lyric Theatre in Barrack Street, Bridport (series 1, episode 5).
 The Fleet and Abbotsbury Swannery - (series 1, episode 6).
 Charmouth Beach - (series 1, episode 8).
 Bridehaven Police Station - Bridport Police Station, Barrack Street (series 2, now Peeler's Court).
 Bridehaven Community Hospital - Bridport Community Hospital (series 2, episode 2).
 Bridehaven Caravan Park - West Bay Holiday Park (series 2, episode 4).
 Bosterman Caves - Beer Quarry Caves (series 2, episode 6).
 Bridehaven Football Club - Bridport Football Club (series 2, episode 6).
 Heymouth - Weymouth (series 1 and 2).

Cast
 Nick Berry as Lt. Comm. Mike Nicholls (Series 1–2)
 Tina Hobley as WPC/DC Melanie Rush (Series 1–2)
 Gerard Horan as Tony Simpson (Series 1–2)
 Tim Matthews as Steve Blade (Series 1–2)
 Freddie Davies as George Blade (Series 1–2)
 Matilda Ziegler as Jane Ford (Series 1, Episodes 1–10)
 Paola Dionisotti as Bella "Aunt" Nicholls (Series 1, Episodes 1–10)
 Louis Mahoney as Elvis (Series 1, Episodes 1–10)
 Francis Pope as Jason Blade (Series 1, Episodes 1–10)
 Liam Tattershall as Jake Ford (Series 1, Episodes 1–10)
 Emma Pike as Kelly Blade (Series 1, Episodes 1–6, 8–10)
 Margot Leicester as Rita Blade (Series 1, Episodes 1–5, 7 and 10)
 Gillian Raine as Nancy Ford (Series 1, Episodes 1–5)
 Daniel Ryan as P.C. Raymond Busby (Series 1, Episodes 5, 8 and 9)

Episode list

Series Overview

Series 1 (1999)

Series 2 (2000)

References

External links
 

1999 British television series debuts
2000 British television series endings
1990s British drama television series
2000s British drama television series
BBC television dramas
Bridport
Television series by All3Media
English-language television shows
Television shows set in Dorset